The QSI International School of Shenzhen (QSI Shenzhen; QSI 深圳蛇口科爱赛国际学校) is an international school in the Nanshan District of Shekou, Shenzhen, Guangdong Province, China. It is part of the Quality Schools International organization.

The Shekou campus was previously QSI International School of Shekou. QSI Shekou and QSI Shenzhen used to be separate schools, with QSI Shekou serving ages 2-18 and QSI International School of Shenzhen serving ages 2-13.  it is one of eight schools in Shenzhen designated for children of foreign workers.

History
QSI International School of Shenzhen-Shekou was established in 2000 but was not opened to students until August 2001.

QSI International School of Shenzhen, later known as QSI International School of Shenzhen-Nanshan, opened in August 2006.

A new Nanshan-area campus was scheduled to open in fall 2013.

Campuses
 
The primary campus is in the Bitao Center on Taizi Road . The previous QSI Shenzhen-Shekou school was headquartered in this building, on the 5th floor.

The QSI Shenzhen-Nanshan campus is in A1, TCL Science Park, Nanshan District. The previous QSI Shenzhen campus was in Honeylake, Futian District, adjacent to the Shenzhen Celebrities Club.

See also
 Education in Shenzhen

Notes

References

External links 

 QSI International School of Shenzhen
 
 

Primary schools in China
High schools in Shenzhen
International schools in Shenzhen
International Baccalaureate schools in China
Shenzhen
Association of China and Mongolia International Schools
Educational institutions established in 2000
2000 establishments in China
Private schools in Guangdong